"I Still Remember" is a song by English rock band Bloc Party. It was released as a single from their second studio album, A Weekend in the City., being the first U.S. single and second UK single from the album. The single was released in Britain in two 7" formats as well as a CD version. The B-sides are "Atonement", "Cain Said To Abel", "Selfish Son", and "I Still Remember (Music Box And Tears Remix)". A limited edition "I Still Remember" 7" was also given to the first 1000 people who pre-ordered the album from Insound. The music video was made by Aggressive and was first shown on 8 January 2007 on MTV2. The song peaked at number 24 on the Billboard Modern Rock Tracks chart , making it the band's highest-charting single in the US.

Song inspiration
Frontman Kele Okereke talked about the song at some length in his January 2007 The Observer interview, responding to questions as to whether the song had an autobiographical nature:

Not really ... I guess, partially. [Can we call it a gay love story?] Yeah, but is it a love story? It's one person longing for somebody they can't really have. But it's not consummated. It's not a mutual thing. ... 
This is probably a contentious issue, but I swear that I could always see [male homosexual attraction] in people, in the way that guys would need to be touching other guys. You could see there was something they couldn't say aloud. And I saw it when I was at school. And I guess "I Still Remember" is an attempt at trying to confront that. ... I know from my own experiences a lot of heterosexual boys had feelings or experiences when they were younger. And that's not really ever spoken about, that un-spoken desire. ...
Not two gay boys ... but the idea of two straight boys having an attraction, or there being an attraction that's unspeakable – that was the idea of that song.

Track listing

7" singles
 Wichita / WEBB125S (UK) (in gatefold sleeve which houses second 7")

 Wichita / WEBB125SX (UK)

CD
 Wichita / WEBB125SCD (UK)

Promo CD

Charts

References

External links
 Song lyrics
 Video on the artist MTV page
 Downloadable video
 Winning Video of the YouTube Competition

2007 singles
Bloc Party songs
LGBT-related songs
Song recordings produced by Jacknife Lee
2007 songs
Wichita Recordings singles
Songs written by Kele Okereke
Songs written by Gordon Moakes
Songs written by Russell Lissack
Songs written by Matt Tong